The Daughter is a 2015 Australian drama film written and directed by Simon Stone, starring an ensemble cast led by Geoffrey Rush. The film was released in Australia on 17 March 2016 to generally favourable reviews. The film is a reworking of Henrik Ibsen's 1884 play, The Wild Duck.

Plot
Christian Nielsen, a recovering alcoholic, returns home to Australia from the United States for the wedding of his father, Henry, to his much younger housekeeper, Anna.

He finds out that Charlotte, Henry's previous housekeeper, and wife of his childhood friend, Oliver, had an affair with Henry, and that their teen-age daughter, Hedvig, is actually his half-sister. Christian's wife, who was supposed to also attend the wedding, instead dumps him by phone call. Christian, feeling miserable, begins drinking heavily again. At the wedding, hating Henry for how he treated his mother who committed suicide, Christian is compelled to tell Oliver about the affair.

Oliver is devastated, and, after realizing that Hedvig is not his daughter, leaves Charlotte. Christian then tells Hedvig the truth. She goes to Oliver, but he tells her he cannot look at her, after which she tries to commit suicide using her grandfather's shotgun. Oliver and Charlotte reunite in the hospital, where Hedvig lies in recovery.

Cast
Paul Schneider as Christian Nielsen
Geoffrey Rush as Henry Nielsen, Christian's father
Ewen Leslie as Oliver Finch, Christian's childhood friend and Charlotte's husband
Miranda Otto as Charlotte Finch, Oliver's wife
Odessa Young as Hedvig Finch, Charlotte and Oliver's daughter
Anna Torv as Anna, Henry's housekeeper and wife-to-be
Sam Neill as Walter Finch, Oliver's father
Nicholas Hope as Peterson

Release
The Daughter was shown in the Special Presentations section of the 2015 Toronto International Film Festival. The film was released in Australia on 17 March 2016.

Reception
The Daughter received generally positive reviews from critics. On review aggregator website Rotten Tomatoes, the film has an approval rating of 77% based on 61 reviews, with an average rating of 6.90/10. The critical consensus reads, "With The Daughter, debuting writer-director Simon Stone turns Henrik Ibsen's The Wild Duck into a thoughtful meditation on the bonds of family, friendship, and community". On Metacritic, the film has a weighted average score of 62 out of 100 based on 12 reviews, indicating "generally favorable reviews".

Jessica Kiang of IndieWire gave the film a B+, saying in her closing comments that it is "a highly polished film that belies the soap opera melodrama of its plotline by having the twists and turns spring directly from well-observed human behavior, Stone’s The Daughter is a quiet, immensely affecting triumph that proves how, contrary to accepted wisdom, there are secrets that would better remain untold".

Wendy Ide of The Guardian gave the film 4 out of 5, saying that "A family's long-buried secret is unearthed in an Ibsen adaptation marked by fine performances". Eddie Cockrell of Variety compared The Daughter to another directors' masterpiece, The Wild Duck. Rochelle Siemienowicz of SBS was quoted saying that "[the film is] confident, low-key modernising of classic European material for the Australian setting",

Accolades

See also
The Wild Duck (1984 film)

References

External links

2015 drama films
2015 directorial debut films
2015 films
Australian drama films
Films about dysfunctional families
Films based on works by Henrik Ibsen
Films shot in Sydney
2010s English-language films
Screen Australia films
Roadshow Entertainment films